Finiq is a settlement, considered town or village, and municipality in Vlorë County, in southern Albania located 8 km from the Ionian Sea and 20 km north of the Greek border. It was formed at the 2015 local government reform by the merger of the former communes Aliko, Dhivër, Livadhja, Mesopotam, and Finiq itself. It is inhabited by ethnic Greeks and is one of two municipalities in Albania in which Greeks form a majority, alongside Dropull. The seat of the municipality is the village Dermish. The total population is 10,529 (2011 census), in a total area of 444.28 km2.

The population of the former municipality at the 2011 census was 1,333; according to the civil offices, which count all citizens including those who live abroad, was 6,780 (2011 estimate).

Name
The ancient name of the Greek toponym was not preserved through literary revival. As such the modern settlement retained in the Ottoman register of 1431 its name Finiki.

History
In antiquity, Phoenice was the political center of the Epirot Greek tribe of the Chaonians. Early Byzantine architecture (4th-7th century) is evident in the settlement in particular that of the three aisled basilica type.

The settlement retained its ancient name and is mentioned in an Ottoman record of 1431 as Finiki. According to the Chronicle of Gjirokaster the first years of Ottoman rule (15th century) were peaceful but after the Fall of Constantinople (1453) Finiki (that time known as Phinikoupolis) was destroyed by the Muslims. At the end of the 16th century Finiki witnessed a drastic population increase and became one of the largest settlements in the area with 359 households (compared to contemporary Gjirokastër with 302 and Delvine with only 204 taxable households).

At 1870 a secondary Greek language school was already operating in Finiq.

Demographics

Ottoman registries
In the Defter of the Sanjak of Delvinë from 1431-1432, 4 villages in the area of Vurgu are recorded: Finiki (Finiqi), Vurgo, Jeromi and Krajna (Kranéja) each with very few inhabitants. Among these villages, the Ottoman register of 1520 attests typical Albanian names are attested inscribed  such as: Gjin, Reçi,Leka,Gjon, Dorza, Meksh Nika and Deda.

The Ottoman defter of 1582 for the Sanjak of Delvina provides records for the village of Finiq. A significant portion of the anthroponyms recorded in the register belonged to the Albanian onomastic sphere, including personal names such as Bos, Dedë, Dodë, Gjergj, Gjin, Gjokë, Gjon, Lalë, Lekë, Muzhak, and others. However, more ambiguous or general Christian anthroponyms that were historically used by both Albanian and non-Albanian groups are also attested. In Finiq, a quarter of the population recorded bore purely Albanian anthroponyms. These figures do not take into account kinship ties shared between individuals bearing typical Albanian anthroponymy and those bearing more ambiguous names, and also do not include those bearing names that can be etymologically explained through Albanian (e.g., Buzmiri, Bala, Bardhi, Burriqi, Buzuku, Çobani, Dera, Iriqi, Kuka,Marsi, Mara, Macja, Poçi, Plaku, Uk, Ylli). As such the ethnic Albanian element must have represented a larger proportion.

19th century
Athanasios Psalidas (1767–1829), counselor of Ali Pasha of Ioannina noted that the town was inhabited by an ethnic Greek community.

Modern demographics
The 2015 Albanian civil registry, which counts all citizens including those who live abroad, recorded a much higher municipal population of 39,055. The municipal unit of Finiq comprises the villages Finiq, Buronjë (Mavropull), Çlirim, Vrion, Karahaxhë and Bregas (Vromero). 

The town of Finiq and all the villages of the municipality are exclusively inhabited by Greeks, except the village of Çlirim, which is mixed.

According to the ministry of foreign affairs of Albania, the Greek population of the commune of Finiq amounts to 5531, making it the Greeks a majority. The inhabitants use the Greek language towards local government authorities and the toponyms and street addresses are written in both Albanian and Greek in official documents.

See also
Phoenice
Chaonians

References

Sources

External links
 https://web.archive.org/web/20081028140625/http://www.phoinike.com/

Finiq
Municipalities in Vlorë County
Epirus
Labëria
Greek communities in Albania
Administrative units of Finiq
Towns in Albania